Hoërskool Voortrekker  is a public Afrikaans medium co-educational high school situated in the municipality of Boksburg in the city of Ekurhuleni in the Gauteng province of South Africa. The academic school was established in 1920.

Founder
Ds. James Murray Louw  studied for the ministry at Victoria College, Stellenbosch.  The first Nederduitse Gereformeerde church in Boksburg was a wood and iron building on the corner of Market and Trichardts streets, opposite Market Square, where the Old Town Hall is situated.  Ds. Louw was the second minister for the Boksburg congregation.   He assumed duties in December 1898. When the Anglo-Boer War broke out, Ds. Louw left for the Natal front with the Boksburg Commando on 12 October 1899. For the next two and half years Ds. Louw stayed with the Republic forces. On 5 June 1902  Ds. Louw and the remnants of the Boksburg Commando laid down their weapons finally at Kraal station, just south of Heidelberg. Under his leadership, the "Klipkerk" was built in 1912. Ds. Louw was especially concerned about education and welfare of orphans. Immediately after returning from the war, he arranged housing for 20 Boksburg war orphans.

The scoured earth policy of the British government had the consequence that there was an influx of Afrikaners looking for work on the coal and gold mines on the Witswatersrand.

After the war Ds Louw started campaigning for the establishment of a secondary school for Afrikaans speaking children on the Witswatersrand.

By 1938 Louw   was frail and in poor health. As one of the last surviving preachers who had stayed with the Boer forces throughout the war, he was asked to deliver the sermon at the foundation stone laying for the Voortrekker Monument on 16 June 1938

History
Voortrekker High School   was the first Afrikaans school on the Witswatersrand. The school was started by a group of Afrikaners, under the leadership of Louw, who wanted their children to have an alternative to English schools.

In April 1918 the East Rand School Council undertook a feasibility study to see if there are sufficient Afrikaans speaking pupils past standard five to justify an Afrikaans medium school.

The survey confirmed the need for an Afrikaans secondary school. Through the hard work of Louw, the OOSRANDSE HOLLANDSE MEDIUM HOËRSKOOL was established on 29 January 1920. The school started in Nobby's Bar   next to the Boksburg Lake with 67 learners and 6 educators. Mr. an Wyk was the acting principal. At the start of the second quarter Mr. AM Muller became the first permanent principal. At the start of the third quarter the school was renamed Hoërskool Voortrekker. In 1922 the school relocated to a shop in the Morris arcade.

In 1923  du Toit became the new principal and shortly afterwards the erection of a permanent school building began.

On 30 July 1924 the new school buildings were officially inaugurated by Professor J. H. Hofmeyer, Administrator of Transvaal.

In 1935 a fund raising was started to build an assembly hall and domestic science centre. Bernard Stanley Cooke was appointed as architect. Cooke  died in January 2011 at the age of 100. Mr Cooke was responsible for many Art Deco buildings in Johannesburg including Escom House and buildings of the Rand Easter Show grounds. He was also responsible for the drawings of the Tower of Light at the show grounds. Anton van Wouw, South Africa most renowned sculptor was commissioned to create a bas-relief depicting the "Groot Trek".

 
Anton van Wouw’s work includes the statue of Paul Kruger on Church Square Pretoria, the Woman Memorial in Bloemfontein and statues at the Voortrekker Monument. Building of the hall started in July 1936 and the building and bas relief was inaugurated on 9 December 1938.

In 1974 a statue of a Voortrekker Boy and Girl by the sculptor P Potgieter was  unveiled.

In 1976 a new hall was inaugurated. The hall was named after the principal T. S. Welman.

In 1999 Voortrekker became a dual medium school.

Nobby's Bar
"Nobby Henrey was the personification of the Rand Pioneer. He was open-hearted, generous to a fault, his good deeds can hardly be counted, and many a Boksburg resident down on his or her luck have reason to bless the day they met him." Born in Cradock in 1861, Edward Barrett Henrey decided to try his luck at the gold diggings in Barberton at the age of eighteen. Unsuccessful, he returned home but the lure of gold got the better of him and he returned to the old Transvaal and eventually arrived in Elsburg in 1885. In 1886 when  were auctioned off in Boksburg he selected a stand opposite the Old Post Office and there established what was to become the renowned "Nobby’s Bar." At the time he built the bar, he didn’t realise that his hostelry would eventually be situated in a prime position on the shores of "Montagu’s Folly," the Boksburg Lake, which became the "Beautiful Pleasure Resort of the Rand."

"From the very beginning, Nobby’s Bar was the centre of social life to the Boksburg pioneers. Here most of the meetings took place. It was from here that the first alumni from Voortrekker High School were sent out and it was in Nobby’s Bar that the various churches held their services right up until the time first billiard table on the East Rand was imported and placed in position. In one of the outhouses he kept a pet bear sent to him by a friend. Nobby's Bar was the first premises for two high schools namely Voortrekker and Boksburg High schools. Unfortunately this establishment did not stood the test of time and there is no sign of it left or the building - Morris arcade

Principals
 Mr. A.M. Muller     1920 —  1922
 Mr. A.E. du Toit   1923 —  1951
 Mr. G.H.B. Dykman  1951 -  1953
 Mr. J.P. van der Vyfver 1954 -1957
 Mr. T. S. Welman     1957 — 1978
 Mr. C.J. Joubert      1978 — 1989
 Mr. C.P Viljoen  1990 - 1992
 Mr. M.P. van Heerden   1993 —  2018
 Mrs. A.F. Black 2019 -

School badge
The badge was designed by Mr. Saville Davis (former manager of ERPM). In 1932 the badge in its present form was accepted and the first were imported from Switzerland. In the same year the new colours (blue, green and yellow) were accepted and the motto “Voorwaart” was changed to “Vorentoe”.

At the top of the badge is the ox–wagon a symbol of the Afrikaner nation and its rise. Beneath the ox-wagon is the Bible as the only light and guidance. The mealies are symbolic of the Highveld of Transvaal. The gold mine is the source of income and represents Boksburg.

School Anthem

Afrikaans

Hier benoorde die Vaal, waar die duine verrys

In die hartjie van Voortrekkerland

Pryk die vrug van ons arbeid, die bron van ons krag

Bloei ons Voortrekkerskool op die Rand.

Hoera, vir ons Voortrekkerskool op die Rand

Ons hart en ons hand bied ons jou.

Beur vorentoe, Trekkers van Voortrekkerland

Wees sterk om te handhaaf en te bou.

Beur vorentoe, Trekkers van Voortrekkerland!

Wees sterk om te handhaaf en bou!

English
To the North of the Vaal, where the dunes reach up high

In the midst of our Voortrekkerland

Vaunts the fruit of our labour, the well of our strength

Prospers Voortrekker School on the Rand.

Hurrah, for our Voortrekker School on the Rand

We bid you our heart and our hand.

To the fore, you Trekkers of Voortrekkerland

Be strong to up - hold and to grow.

To the fore, you Trekkers of Voortrekkerland!

Be strong to up - hold and grow!

Sport achievements
 1923 Finalist Administrators Cup (Pretoria Boys High 17 Voortrekker 0)
 1934 Finalist Administrators Cup (Zeerust 11 Voortrekker 8)
1958 Joint Winner of Administrators Cup (Voortrekker 6 Lichtenburg 6)- Rugby
2013 Rugby (under 15) Beeld Trophy Winner
1958 Winner of Regional Inter-high Athletics Meeting

Notable alumni

Arts and entertainment
Jamie Uys (30 May 1921 – 29 January 1996) Afrikaans and International Film producer/director
Jans Rautenbach  Screenwriter and ( 1936 - 2016)Afrikaans Film producer/director
Tommie Meyer Afrikaans Film producer/director
Jan Scholtz  Film Producer and screenwriter
Dawid Engela (30 October 1931 – 25 November 1967) was a South African broadcaster, composer, and musicologist
De Wet van Rooyen Opera Singer
Steve de Villiers Sports commentator and Director General of the SABC

Politicians
Barend du Plessis  Minister of Finance 
Sakkie Blanche       Minister of Welfare –MEC- Gauteng

Academics
 Professor Walter Marasas (1941–2012) University of Pretoria 
 Professor Desiree (Ferreira) Vorster Vice Rector University of Johannesburg
 Professor Jan van Heerden  University of Pretoria
 Professor Estelle (Blanche) Swart University of Stellenbosch
 Professor Leon Snyman University of Pretoria
 Professor Nielen van der Merwe Wits School of Mining Engineering.
 Professor William Reyneke University of Pretoria
 Professor Chris Boshoff is Professor of Cancer Medicine at University Collega Londen, and Director of the UCL Cancer Institute
 Professor Wayne Pearce University of Penn State

Business and community leaders
 Attie du Plessis  Ex Chairman of Gencor and Sentrachem
 Chantyl Mulder SAICA:2011 Most Influential Women in Business and Government and The University of Johannesburg's Ellen Kuzwayo Council Award 
 Marius Marais - developer of the MNet decoder

Sport achievers – National colours
Johan Steenekamp (*1935 +2007), Springbok Rugby player. Johan played 1 Test against the French as lock at the age of 22. The final score was SA 3 France 3.

Jan Adriaan Smit (*1924 +) Springbok Shooting (1962-74)

Writers
 Cor Dirks (Vice-head master, although he did not go to school here) the writer of children books like "Die Uile" and "Die Otters"

References

Further reading
 Pakenham, Thomas (1979). The Boer War. New York: Random House. 
 Kuit, Albert (1948). Kommandoprediker. Pretoria.
 Olivier, PJ (1952). Ons gemeentelike feesalbum.. Kaapstad en Pretoria: N.G. Kerk-uitgewers.
 Pieter Johannes Meyer (1984) Nog nie ver genoeg nie. Perskor
 Marius J. Swart. (1987) Ons voortbestaan: die kultuurstrewe van die Afrikaner.Oranjewerkers Promosies,

External links
 
 http://www.Boksburghistorical.com

Educational institutions established in 1920
High schools in South Africa
Schools in Gauteng
Bilingual schools in South Africa
1920 establishments in South Africa
Ekurhuleni